Batillaria australis is a species of sea snail, a marine gastropod mollusk in the family Batillariidae.

Description

Distribution

References

 Ozawa, T., Köhler, F., Reid, D.G. & Glaubrecht, M. (2009). Tethyan relicts on continental coastlines of the northwestern Pacific Ocean and Australasia: molecular phylogeny and fossil record of batillariid gastropods (Caenogastropoda, Cerithioidea). Zoologica Scripta, 38: 503–525.

External links

Batillariidae
Gastropods described in 1834